Spruce Lake is a lake located northwest of Piseco, New York. Fish species present in the lake are brook trout, and black bullhead. There is trail access on the east shore from the Northville-Placid Trail. No motors are allowed on this lake.

References

Lakes of New York (state)
Lakes of Hamilton County, New York